The 2020–21 Stanford Cardinal women's basketball team represented Stanford University during the 2020–21 NCAA Division I women's basketball season. The Cardinal, led by thirty-fifth year head coach Tara VanDerveer, played their home games at the Maples Pavilion as members of the Pac-12 Conference. As a result of Santa Clara County, California health orders, the Cardinal were unable to play in Palo Alto for much of their season, moving home games to Kaiser Permanente Arena in Santa Cruz. They finished the season 31–2, 19–2 in Pac-12 play to finish in first place. They won the Pac-12 women's tournament by defeating UCLA, earning an automatic bid to the NCAA women's tournament where they defeated Utah Valley and Oklahoma State in the first and second rounds, Missouri State in the Sweet Sixteen, Louisville in the Elite Eight, South Carolina in the Final Four and Arizona in the National Championship Game to win its third NCAA title overall and first since 1992. Haley Jones was named the Final Four Most Outstanding Player.

Roster

Schedule

|-
!colspan=9 style=| Regular season

|-
!colspan=9 style=| Pac-12 women's tournament

|-
!colspan=9 style=| NCAA women's tournament

Rankings

^ Coaches did not release a Week 2 poll

References

Stanford Cardinal women's basketball seasons
Stanford
Stanford
NCAA Division I women's basketball tournament Final Four seasons
NCAA Division I women's basketball tournament championship seasons